Mount Hoyo is a mountain in the eastern Democratic Republic of the Congo. The mountain is a limestone massif with 40 caves.

References

External links 

Hoyo
Archaeological sites in the Democratic Republic of the Congo